Krishna Kanta Handiqui State Open University is a state university in Guwahati, Assam, India. It was founded in 2006.

KKHSOU offers a range of undergraduate, postgraduate, diploma, and certificate courses in various fields such as humanities, social sciences, commerce, management, science, and technology. The university also offers professional courses in fields like law, journalism, and mass communication.

History
The university was established by the Assam Legislative Assembly by Act XXXVII of 2005 in 2005. The Act received the assent from the Governor on the same year.

It was recognized by the University Grants Commission in 2009, which lists 2007 as the year of establishment.

Locations
KKHSOU runs from three locations:
 Permanent campus: Patgaon, Rani Gate, Guwahati-781017
 City Office: Resham Nagar, Khanapara, Guwahati=781022
 Jorhat Regional Centre: Tarajan, Jorhat, Assam 785001

See also
 List of institutions of higher education in Assam

References

External links
 
 KKSHOU Time Table
 KKSHOU Results
 Vice Chancellor - Krishna Kanta Handique State open University.
 VC Prof. Kandarpa Das suspended.
 Assam Governor suspends the VC of KKHSOU, Prof. Kandarpa Das

Universities in Assam
Open universities in India
State universities in India
Educational institutions established in 2006
2006 establishments in Assam